Joanes Rail (born November 24, 1958 in Kirkland Lake, Ontario) is a Canadian former handball player who competed in the 1976 Summer Olympics.

She was part of the Canadian handball team, which finished sixth in the Olympic tournament. She played two matches.

References
 profile

1958 births
Living people
Canadian female handball players
Olympic handball players of Canada
Handball players at the 1976 Summer Olympics
Sportspeople from Kirkland Lake